Košarkaški klub Zlatibor, commonly referred to as KK Zlatibor or Zlatibor Gold Gondola due to sponsorship reasons, is a men's professional basketball club based in Čajetina, Serbia. They are currently competing in the Basketball League of Serbia and the ABA League Second Division

History
Basketball beginnings in Čajetina came with the success of amateur sports competition in western Serbia known as the MOSI. Pioneers of basketball in Čajetina, Sead Begović, and Radomir Raković among the others founded KK Zlatibor on 19 September 1979. The first club president was Aleksandar Vasiljević. Most of its history, Zlatibor played in 3rd-tier league West Division with several attempts of attacking 1st place which leads to the higher league. Finally, in 2015 after the win against neighbor-team Priboj from Priboj, the club got promoted to the Second League of Serbia. In the 2016–17 season, Zlatibor won the Second League and got promoted to the Basketball League of Serbia for the 2017–18 season. That year Zlatibor ended up in 4th place which took them to the second phase – Basketball League of Serbia. After group phase and matches against Crvena Zvezda, Borac, Mega Bemax, Tamiš, and Mladost, the club advanced to the playoffs with a 4–6 record. The same year, the club won the 2018 Cup of Serbia, advancing to quarterfinals of the 2018 Radivoj Korać Cup.

Zlatibor recognized four former players for great achievements in the club's history as the Legends: Sead Begović, Radomir Raković, Želimir Džambić, and Duško Pantović.

In April 2022, Zlatibor won the ABA League Second Division for the 2021–22 season following a 78–73 overtime win over MZT Skopje Aerodrom. In June 2022, Zlatibor got a invitation from the FIBA Basketball Champions League for the 2022–23 season. Later, they withdrawn. 
In June 2022, the club added retired NBA Player Nikola Peković to its managing board.

Players

Retired numbers

Current roster

Coaches

  Mladen Šekularac (2015)
  Predrag Jaćimović (2015–2016)
  Dušan Radović (2016–2017)
  Vanja Guša (2017–2019)
  Strajin Nedović (2019–present)

Trophies and awards

Trophies
ABA League Second Division
Winner (1): 2021–22
Second League of Serbia (2nd-tier)
Winner (1): 2016–17
First Regional League of Serbia (3rd-tier)
Winner (1): 2014–15
League Cup of Serbia (2nd-tier)
Winner (1): 2017–18

Individual awards
ABA League Second Division MVP Award (1):
  Dušan Kutlešić – 2021–22
Serbian League MVP Award (1):
  Dušan Kutlešić – 2021–22

Notable players 
  Robert Songolo Ngijol
  Nikola Vasić
  Mladen Šekularac

References

External links
 KK Zlatibor official website 
 Profile at eurobasket.com

Zlatibor
Zlatibor
Basketball teams established in 1979